Miami Pop Festival is a posthumous live album by the Jimi Hendrix Experience, documenting their May 18, 1968 performance at the Pop & Underground Festival in Hallandale, Florida. It features eight songs recorded during their evening performance, along with two extra songs.

The album was released on November 5, 2013, in conjunction with the Jimi Hendrix video documentary, Hear My Train A Comin'.  "Fire" and "Foxey Lady", recorded during the afternoon-show, were also released as a stereo 45 rpm single. The album reached number 39 on the US Billboard 200 album chart and number 120 on the Belgian (Walloon) chart.

Critical reception

In a review for AllMusic, Mark Demming gave the album three and a half out of five stars, noting that "the recording is clean and full of detail ... and the Experience sound quite good ... but it doesn't cast much new light on his music or his performance style, making for a good but not a great live release".

Track listing

Personnel
Jimi Hendrix – vocals, guitar
Noel Redding – bass guitar, backing vocals
Mitch Mitchell – drums

References

2013 live albums
Live albums published posthumously
Jimi Hendrix live albums
Albums produced by Eddie Kramer